Darlene Clark Hine (born February 7, 1947) is an American author and professor in the field of African-American history. She is a recipient of the 2014 National Humanities Medal.

Early life and education

Darlene Clark was born in Morley, Missouri, the oldest of four children of Levester Clark, a truck driver, and Lottie Mae Clark. She married William C. Hine in 1970 and divorced in 1974. She married Johnny E. Brown in 1981 and divorced in 1986 and has one daughter, Robbie Davine.

Hine received her BA in 1968 from Roosevelt University, her MA from Kent State University in 1970 and her PhD in 1975 from the same institution.

Career
From 1972 to 1974 Hine worked as an assistant professor of history and black studies at South Carolina State College, from 1974 to 1979 she was an assistant professor at Purdue University in West Lafayette, Indiana, and from 1979 to 1985 an associate professor at Purdue.

From 1985 to 2004, Hine served as the John A. Hannah Professor of History at Michigan State University in East Lansing. She helped to establish one of the first doctoral programs in comparative black history. She also helped edit a series on African-American history in the United Statesman Milestones in African American History.

In 2004, Hine joined Northwestern University as the Board of Trustees Professor of African-American Studies and Professor of History. She retired from the university in 2017.

Culture of dissemblance

In 1989, in an article titled "Rape and the Inner Lives of Black Women in the Middle West: Preliminary Thoughts on the Culture of Dissemblance," Hine introduced the concept of a "culture of dissemblance." She defined dissemblance as "the behavior and attitudes of Black women that created the appearance of openness and disclosure but actually shielded the truth of their inner lives and selves from their oppressors." The concept helped Hine identify why "African-American women developed a code of silence around intimate matters as a response to discursive and literal attacks on black sexuality." It also diversified the list of reasons Black women might have migrated North, citing "sexual violence and abuse as [catalysts] for migration."

Evelyn Brooks Higginbotham has written that the culture of dissemblance was especially relevant to Black women "of the middle class." In the original article, Hine states that the most "institutionalized forms" of the culture of dissemblance exist in the creation of the National Association of the Colored Women's Clubs in 1896.

Publications
Hine wrote three books about African-American women's history. Her book Black Women in Whites was named Outstanding Book by the Gustavus Myers Center Of Study of Human Rights. She edited a two-volume encyclopedia, Black Women in America. Her book A Shining Thread of Hope was favorably reviewed in the New York Times. She co-edited with John McCluskey Jr The Black Chicago Renaissance (2012).

Hines' papers are preserved in the David M. Rubenstein Rare Book & Manuscript Library at Duke University.

Awards and accolades
Because of her expertise on the subject of race, class, and gender in American society, Hine received the Otto Wirth Alumni Award for outstanding scholarship from Roosevelt University in 1988 and the Special achievement award from Kent State University Alumni Association in 1991. Hine was awarded an honorary doctorate from the University of Massachusetts in 1998, Amherst from Purdue University in 2002. She served as president of the Organization of American Historians from 2001-2002.

In 2010 the Organization of American Historians presented the inaugural Darlene Clark Hine Award for best book in African American Women and Gender History.

Hine was presented in 2013 with a National Humanities Medal by President Barack Obama, for her work on understanding the African-American experience.

References

External links
Darlene Clark Hine official Page at Michigan State University
Guide to the Darlene Clark Hine Papers, David M. Rubenstein Rare Book & Manuscript Library, Duke University

1947 births
Living people
National Humanities Medal recipients
African-American women writers
African-American historians
Historians of race relations
Historians from Missouri
American women historians
20th-century American historians
20th-century American women writers
21st-century American historians
21st-century American women writers
People from Scott County, Missouri
Roosevelt University alumni
Kent State University alumni
South Carolina State University faculty
Purdue University faculty
Michigan State University faculty
Northwestern University faculty